MOL Presence is a container ship, operated by Mitsui O.S.K. Lines. The cargo ship was built in 2008 at Koyo Dockyard in Mihara, Japan. The ship has total capacity for 6,350 TEU at 16 rows with 500 reefer plugins.

Design 
The container ship MOL Presence has overall length , beam , depth  and summer draft . With this size the ship can carry total 6,350 TEU (2,912 TEU in the holds and 3,438 TEU on the deck).

Engineering 
MOL Presence has main engine MAN B&W 11K98MC. The total output power of the aggregate is 84,350 hp, achieved at 94 rpm. That power is enough for the ship to reach service (economy) speed of 26.0 kn.

Registry 
MOL Presence is owned and managed by the Mitsui O.S.K. Lines. The ship operated at the flag of Singapore. The IMO number is 9444273, the MMSI is 564803000 and the call sign is 9V8990.

See also 
 Hyundai Pride

References

External links
MOL Presence

Container ships
Merchant ships of Singapore
2007 ships